The IEEE Power & Energy Society (IEEE PES), formerly the IEEE Power Engineering Society, is the oldest society of the Institute of Electrical and Electronics Engineers (IEEE) focused on the scientific and engineering knowledge about electric power and energy.

PES Technical Council 
On 14 January 2016, the IEEE PES Governing Board approved the PES Technical Committee reorganization.  This resulted in twenty coordinating and technical committees as follows:

Intelligent Grid and Emerging Technologies Coordinating Committee
Marine Systems Coordinating Committee
Wind and Solar Power Coordinating Committee

Technical Committees 

Analytics Methods for Power Systems Committee
Electric Machinery Committee
Energy Development and Power Generation Committee
Energy Storage and Stationary Battery Committee
Insulated Conductors Committee
Nuclear Power Engineering Committee
Power System Communications and Cybersecurity Committee
Power System Dynamic Performance Committee
Power System Instrumentation and Measurements Committee
Power System Operations, Planning and Economics Committee
Power System Relaying and Control Committee
Smart Buildings, Loads and Customer Systems Committee
Substations Committee
Surge Protective Devices Committee
Switchgear Committee
Transformers Committee
Transmission and Distribution Committee

Publications 
IEEE Transactions on Energy Conversion
IEEE Transactions on Power Delivery
IEEE Transactions on Power Systems
IEEE Transactions on Sustainable Energy
IEEE Electrification Magazine
IEEE Transactions on Smart Grid
IEEE Power & Energy Magazine

Conferences 

The society sponsors a number of annual conferences that focus on its fields of interest. The principal events by IEEE PES are:
IEEE PES General Meeting (www.pes-gm.org)
IEES PES T&D (https://ieeet-d.org/)
IEEE PES ISGT Series of events

References 

IEEE societies